Jan Veleba (born 6 December 1986 in Brno) is a Czech athlete specialising in the sprinting events. He represented his country at three outdoor and two indoor European Championships.

Competition record

1Did not finish in the final
2Did not start in the final

Personal bests
Outdoor
100 metres – 10.16 (+1.6 m/s) (Brno 2019)
200 metres – 20.86 (+2.0 m/s) (Tábor 2012)
400 metres – 48.81 (Prague 2008)
Indoor
60 metres – 6.65 (Prague 2011)

References

1986 births
Living people
Czech male sprinters
Sportspeople from Brno
Czech Athletics Championships winners